Events in the year 2021 in the Cook Islands.

Incumbents
 Monarch: Elizabeth II
 Queen's Representative: Tom Marsters
 Prime Minister: Mark Brown

Events
Ongoing — COVID-19 pandemic in the Cook Islands

Deaths
1 March – Ngai Tupa, politician, MP (born 1936).

See also
History of the Cook Islands

References

 
2020s in the Cook Islands
Years of the 21st century in the Cook Islands
Cook Islands
Cook Islands